The 1984 French motorcycle Grand Prix was the sixth round of the 1984 Grand Prix motorcycle racing season. It took place on the weekend of 10–11 July 1984 at the Paul Ricard Circuit.

Classification

500 cc

References

French motorcycle Grand Prix
French
Motorcycle Grand Prix